General elections were held in Lebanon between 9 and 23 June 1957. Independent candidates won the majority of seats. Voter turnout was 53.2%.

Results

Electoral districts

Bint Jbeil 
There was a reform of the seat distribution of parliamentary constituencies in 1957, but Bint Jbeil remained a single-member constituency. Instead the neighbouring electoral district of Nabatieh was awarded an additional Shia seat. Ahmad al-As'ad argued that this move had been done deliberately to curtail his political influence. The Bint Jbeil seat was won by Ali Bazzi in the parliamentary election.

References

Lebanon
1957 in Lebanon
Elections in Lebanon
Election and referendum articles with incomplete results